Cassadaga is a Seneca Native American word meaning Water beneath the rocks. It may refer to:

 Cassadaga, Florida 
 Cassadaga, New York
 Cassadaga Lakes, north of the village
 Cassadaga (album), by Bright Eyes
 Cassadaga (film), a 2011 film